Denese Becker (born Dominga Sic Ruiz in 1973) was a survivor of the Río Negro massacres. At 11 she was adopted by an evangelical pastor and his wife in Iowa. She became the subject of a PBS documentary.

References 

Guatemalan Maya people
American evangelicals
People from Iowa
1973 births
Living people